Phaeomolis tavakiliani is a moth of the family Erebidae first described by Hervé de Toulgoët in 1987. It is found in French Guiana.

References

Phaegopterina
Moths described in 1987